Bucculatrix ulocarena is a moth of the family Bucculatricidae. It is found in Australia. It was described in 1923 by Alfred Jefferis Turner.

External links
Australian Faunal Directory

Moths of Australia
Bucculatricidae
Moths described in 1923
Taxa named by Alfred Jefferis Turner